Wu Yue (born 8 October 1997) is a Chinese swimmer. She competed in the women's 4 × 100 metre freestyle relay event at the 2018 Asian Games, winning the silver medal.

References

External links
 

1997 births
Living people
Chinese female freestyle swimmers
Place of birth missing (living people)
Asian Games medalists in swimming
Asian Games gold medalists for China
Asian Games silver medalists for China
Swimmers at the 2018 Asian Games
Medalists at the 2018 Asian Games